IREX can mean:

International Robot Exhibition, a robot trade fair held every two years in Tokyo, Japan
iRex Technologies, the company that produced the iLiad and the iRex Digital Reader 1000 ebook devices
International Research & Exchanges Board, an international nonprofit organization
SS Irex, an 1890 wreck
USS Irex, a 1944 submarine
S/Y Irex (1884 First Class cutter)
 Instrument Rating EXamination (for pilots - CASA)